Les Chansons Neurotiques is the third studio album by Neuroticfish. Female vocals on "Startup" were provided by Eva Spanyar. All songs were written and performed by Neuroticfish.

Track listing
"Startup" - 0:46
"Reinvent the Pain" - 5:14
"Waste" - 3:58
"Prostitute" - 4:12
"Wake Me Up" - 5:11
"Modulator" - 5:10
"Breakdown" - 2:37
"Darkness/Influence" - 4:38
"Stop and Go" 	- 6:06
"It's Not Me" - 5:17
"Inverse" - 4:48
"Need" - 5:34
"Velocity N2" - 4:36

References

2002 albums
Neuroticfish albums